Cherven Peak is a rocky peak rising to 224 m on the north coast of Rugged Island off the west coast of Byers Peninsula of Livingston Island in the South Shetland Islands, Antarctica.  Situated 1.04 km west of Herring Point, 830 m north of San Stefano Peak, 3.9 km east-southeast of Cape Sheffield, and 700 m southeast of Ivan Vladislav Point formed by an offshoot of the peak.

The peak is named after the medieval town of Cherven in northeastern Bulgaria.

Location
Spanish mapping in 1993 and Bulgarian in 2009.

Maps
 Península Byers, Isla Livingston. Mapa topográfico a escala 1:25000. Madrid: Servicio Geográfico del Ejército, 1992.
 L.L. Ivanov. Antarctica: Livingston Island and Greenwich, Robert, Snow and Smith Islands. Scale 1:120000 topographic map.  Troyan: Manfred Wörner Foundation, 2009.

References
 Cherven Peak. SCAR Composite Gazetteer of Antarctica.
 Bulgarian Antarctic Gazetteer. Antarctic Place-names Commission. (details in Bulgarian, basic data in English)

External links
 Cherven Peak. Copernix satellite image

Mountains of the South Shetland Islands
Bulgaria and the Antarctic